Ballymoyer House, now demolished, was an 18th-century country house which stood in a 7000-acre demesne in the townland of Ballintemple, some 5 km (3 miles) north east of Newtownhamilton, County Armagh, Northern Ireland.

Features
The house was a classical 7-bay three-storey building with a stucco facade and a colonnaded porch which had been linked by corridors to a previous building. The older part housed a library, the smaller bedrooms and servants' quarters and the newer part (a much taller three-storey block) the main bedrooms, drawing room and dining room with a balustraded roof parapet.

History
The newer building was constructed in 1778 for Sir Walter Synnot of a well-to-do family of linen merchants who had leased the land from the See of Armagh. He and his son Marcus considerably improved the landscape to the extent that it was described in the Parliamentary Gazetter of 1844 in the following terms: "The mansion built by Sir Walter Synnot and the demesne attached to it is laid out and planted in a tasteful style. Three mountain streams after debouching from the glens of their upper course, unite in the lawn and form a scene both beautiful and romantic". By 1838 the family had bought the land. Sir Walter was High Sheriff of Armagh for 1783 and married Jane Seton. Marcus was High Sheriff in 1830 and died in 1835, succeeded by his son, also Marcus (High Sheriff in 1852). Marcus junior died childless in 1874 and the estate passed to his younger brother Mark Seton Synnot (High Sheriff in 1876). Mark Seton's son, also Mark Seton, a captain in the Armagh Light Infantry, died unmarried in 1901, whereby the estate devolved to his eldest sister Mary Susanna.

Mary Susanna had married in 1868 Major-General Arthur FitzRoy Hart, who had then adopted the surname Hart-Synnot. Their son, Brigadier-General Arthur Henry Seton Hart-Synnot inherited the demesne on his father's death in 1910 and sold portions of it to his tenants prior to 1919 under the Land Acts. He demolished part of the house c.1918 after it had been damaged during requisitioning as military accommodation during World War I and donated the remaining avenue and glen to the National Trust in 1938.

The surrounding land and a second house was purchased by local businessman, Robert Bell in 1940.  Robert Bell was the eldest son of James Bell who was a leading building contractor.  After James died, Robert took over the family business.  Robert married Jane Forsythe from Newtownhamilton whose father run a tailoring business.  Due to the repairs required and the huge cost of rates which were inflicted at war times, the Hart-Synnot family later demolished Ballymoyer House.  The Bell family resided in the second house where they raised their family, Jimmy, Johnnie, Jeannie, Peggy, Leonard, Bobby, Harry and Geordie including grand daughter Molly.  After Robert died the business was carried on by his son Harry. Sadly, Johnny Bell who was unmarried and lived alone in the house was murdered whilst a serving part-time member of the Ulster Defence Regiment.  Johnnie was returning home from his civilian job which was working in the family business whenever gunmen waited and shot him dead at the end of the avenue to his home in 1976.  The Bell family business is still carried on to-day through Harry's sons Rodney, Tom, John and Ivan.  The buildings and surrounding land still belongs to the Bell family and is registered with the Land Registry in the Bell name (2015).

The estate is now open to the public the driveway & lands were given to the National Trust by the Synnot trustees.

References

External links
 official website

Buildings and structures in County Armagh